Paige Frances Hareb (born 6 June 1990) is a professional surfer from Oakura Beach, New Zealand. In December 2008 she became the first New Zealand woman to qualify for the ASP Women's World Tour.

She debuted on the ASP World Tour in December 2008 at the Billabong Pro in Hawaii where she won her second round heat, beating world no.2 Peru's Sofia Mulanovich. In the third round she was beaten by World Champion Stephanie Gilmore.

In her rookie year of the 2009 World Tour she reached the semi-finals of the Roxy Pro in Coolangatta, Australia before being beaten by eventual winner, Gilmore.

Hareb was 2009 Taranaki Sportsperson of the Year.

Hareb placed 3rd in the April 2012 Dow Agro Sciences Pro Tournament, in New Plymouth In 2022 Hareb picked up her first national title as part of a successful campaign for Taranaki surfers.

Surfing Career Highlights
 2022 Winner National Surfing Championships  Open Women's 
 2013 2nd Paul Mitchel Supergirl Pro
 2012 2nd Paul Mitchel Supergirl Pro
 2012 3rd Dow Agro Sciences Pro Tournament
 2012 2nd Swatch Girls Pro France
 2012 10th ASP World Tour
 2010 9th ASP World Tour
 2009 8th ASP World Tour

References

Living people
New Zealand surfers
New Zealand female surfers
World Surf League surfers
People from Taranaki
1990 births